Craig Bingham (born 22 December 1979 in Irvine), is a Scottish footballer. He was a midfielder.

Bingham joined Clyde in the summer of 2000, signing from his hometown junior side Irvine Meadow. Bingham spent two seasons at Broadwood Stadium, but never really established himself in the first team. He made 38 appearances in total, before dropping back down to the junior ranks to sign for Glenafton Athletic in May 2002.

External links

1979 births
Living people
Scottish footballers
Clyde F.C. players
Scottish Football League players
Irvine Meadow XI F.C. players
Glenafton Athletic F.C. players
Footballers from Irvine, North Ayrshire
Association football midfielders